Gaetano Daniele (born 13 July 1956) is an Italian film producer. He was a producer for Il Postino: The Postman (1994) which won the BAFTA Award for Best Film Not in the English Language in 1996. The film also earned him an Academy Award nomination for Best Picture.

References

External links 
 

Italian film producers
Living people
Filmmakers who won the Best Foreign Language Film BAFTA Award
1956 births